Australian Archaeology is a peer-reviewed academic journal published by the Australian Archaeological Association. It was established in 1974 and covers all fields of archaeology as well as other subjects that are relevant to archaeological research and practice in Australia and nearby areas. The journal uses a broad definition of archaeology to include prehistoric, historic, and contemporary periods and includes social, biological, and cultural anthropology, history, Aboriginal studies, environmental science, and other related areas.  the editors are Sean Ulm and Annie Ross assisted by associate editor Ariana Lambrides and book review editor Mirani Litster.

Abstracting and indexing 
The journal is abstracted and indexed in:

References

External links 
 

Archaeology journals
Biannual journals
English-language journals
Publications established in 1974
Historiography of Australia
Academic journals published by learned and professional societies